TNX (pronounced as T-N-X, short for The New Six) is a South Korean boy band formed through the survival audition program Loud by P Nation. The group consists of six members: Kyungjun, Taehun, Hyunsoo, Junhyeok, Hwi, and Sungjun. They debuted on May 17, 2022, with the release of their first extended play Way Up.

Name 
The name, TNX stands for "The New Six", referring to the six members in the group's debut lineup.

History

2021: Formation through Loud

TNX was formed through the SBS K-pop survival audition program Loud that was hosted by two entertainment agencies JYP Entertainment and P Nation in South Korea. The show was a collaboration between Psy and JY Park aka JYP to develop 2 new boy groups; one under JYP Entertainment and another one under P Nation. The TV program had 75 contestants from various countries, and they had to prove themselves to be a debut-worthy talent. Throughout the challenge rounds, the contestants showed their dancing, composing music, writing lyrics, singing, and rapping skills to the two famous judges.   

Loud  premiered on June 5, 2021 and it was broadcast every Saturday at 9 PM KST on SBS. The TV program's finale was on September 11, 2021 with P Nation having seven debuting members. However, on January 24, 2022, P Nation announced Koki Tanaka (13 years old at the time) left the group to continue his training at P Nation, and the yet unnamed boy group became a six-member group.

2022–present: Debut with Way Up and Love Never Dies 
On March 29, 2022, it was announced the group would be officially called TNX (The New Six), and they would make their official debut on May 17, 2022. On April 25, it was announced that the group would debut by the release of their 1st EP Way Up.

In January 2023, their agency P Nation announced through their official fancafe that member Junhyeok would be temporarily halting activities due to health concerns.

On 15 February 2023, TNX released their second EP Love Never Dies with the lead single "Love or Die".

According to P Nation, both "I Need U" and "Love or Die" will serve as double title tracks for their 2nd Mini Album "Love Never Dies

Members
 Kyungjun
 Taehun
 Hyunsoo
 Junhyeok
 Hwi
 Sungjun

Discography

Extended plays

Singles

Other charted songs

Videography

Music videos

Awards and nominations

Notes

References

External links 

 

K-pop music groups
Musical groups established in 2022
South Korean boy bands
South Korean dance music groups
South Korean pop music groups
Musical groups from Seoul
2022 establishments in South Korea